Patrick Duffy (born March 17, 1949) is an American actor and director widely known for his role on the CBS primetime soap opera Dallas, where he played Bobby Ewing, the youngest son of Miss Ellie, and the nicest brother of J.R. Ewing (played by Barbara Bel Geddes and Larry Hagman respectively) from 1978 to 1985 and from 1986 to 1991. Duffy returned to reprise his role as Bobby in a continuation of Dallas, which aired on TNT from 2012 to 2014. He is also well known for his role on the ABC sitcom Step by Step as Frank Lambert from 1991 to 1998, and for his role as Stephen Logan on the CBS daytime soap opera The Bold and the Beautiful (2006–2011). Duffy played the lead character's father in the 2014 NBC sitcom Welcome to Sweden.

Early life 
Duffy was born in Townsend, Montana, in 1949, the son of tavern owners Marie and Terence Duffy. Duffy is of Irish ancestry. During high school, Duffy was living in Everett, Washington, and attended Cascade High School. At Cascade, he participated in the Drama Club and the Pep Club, for which he was a Yell King. Academically, Duffy graduated from the University of Washington in 1971 with a degree in drama.  He ruptured both his vocal cords during his senior year of college, but was hired as actor-in-residence, where he worked as an interpreter for ballet, opera, and orchestra companies in Washington. He also taught mime and movement classes during this period. In a 2021 interview with David A. Weiner, Duffy credits his sister, an international champion diver, with teaching him the necessary swimming techniques for his first career break. She became a police officer in Seattle.

Career 

Duffy appeared in a Taco Bell commercial in the early 1970s playing an employee describing an Enchirito. In 1977, he landed the role of Mark Harris in the short-lived television series Man from Atlantis. Following the series' cancellation in early 1978, he got his big break in the role of Bobby Ewing, opposite Barbara Bel Geddes and Larry Hagman, on the prime-time soap opera Dallas. The show became a worldwide success. Despite its success, Duffy opted to leave the series in 1985 with his character being killed off onscreen. However, with both the show and his career on the decline, he returned in 1986 in the infamous shower scene that rendered the entire 1985–1986 season "just a dream." Duffy then remained with the series until its cancellation in 1991. He also appeared in several episodes of the spin-off series Knots Landing between 1979 and 1982. Throughout the 13-year run of Dallas, Duffy directed several episodes of the series. 
Along with Dallas fame, Duffy has also tried his hand at singing, and in 1983, he had a hit in Europe with "Together We're Strong", a duet with French female singer Mireille Mathieu. The single reached No. 5 in the Netherlands in April 1983.

At the end of Dallas run in 1991, Duffy began another television role, as Frank Lambert on the family sitcom, Step by Step in which he co-starred with Suzanne Somers. The series ran until 1998, and Duffy also directed numerous episodes. Also in the 1990s, he appeared in two Dallas reunion television films; J.R. Returns (1996) and War of the Ewings (1998), both of which he also co-produced. He has reunited on several occasions with many of his Dallas co-stars both onscreen and off, most notably for the non-fiction television special Dallas Reunion: Return to Southfork in 2004. Duffy later continued to act in occasional guest or voice acting appearances, including the series Family Guy (in which he appeared in a live action scene with Victoria Principal as they spoofed the Dallas shower scene), as well as Justice League and Touched by an Angel. Duffy starred in the television films Falling in Love With the Girl Next Door and Desolation Canyon.  In 2006, he began a recurring role on the daytime soap opera The Bold and the Beautiful as Stephen Logan. From April to July 2008, he hosted Bingo America, a partially interactive game show on GSN.

Duffy reprised his role as Bobby Ewing in TNT's continuation series of Dallas. The series aired from 2012 to 2014.

Duffy played a surreal double of Bobby Ewing in the experimental documentary Hotel Dallas, directed by artist duo Ungur & Huang. The film premiered at the 2016 Berlin International Film Festival.

On August 8, 2005, Barbara Bel Geddes died of lung cancer. Duffy had met Bel Geddes through his future father-in-law when he was a boy. At the time of his TV mother's death, he said: When Barbara joined the cast of "Dallas," as Miss Ellie, I considered her to be like Helen Hayes, Katherine Cornell, and Ethel Barrymore — a real "name" in American theater. But you'd never have known it. She exhibited no large ego because of her history. She'd schlepp in and drop your jaw with every performance — whether it was drinking a cup of coffee, having a mastectomy, or losing Jock Ewing. It was remarkable, her ordinariness despite that pedigree. We called Barbara "BBG" on the set. She was the mama figure. Larry Hagman was obviously the prow of the boat, but he couldn't have functioned without a strong mother, and I don't think there's been a mother like her on dramatic television since then. People related to her because she was the epitome of compassion despite her own pain. Off screen, she was a pistol. She cussed like a mule skinner, and she really liked to have her drinks. But she also had an endless capacity to include everybody that she loved, and that was the entire cast. Then, 7 years after his TV mother’s death, at the revival of Dallas, he said: “Barbara is a big piece of our history, and it's important to me to honor her. To come back with Linda Gray as Sue Ellen and Larry Hagman in his J.R. hat, and then see the words Ellie Southworth Ewing Farlow''' on the gravestone made me think, Oh, that's right -- she's gone.'' “ The last thing he said about the revived series, without Bel Geddes as one of the stars: "Through the whole first season, I don't think an episode goes by that Mama is not mentioned in reference to Southfork and the land."

Personal life 
Duffy married Carlyn Rosser, a professional ballerina 10 years his senior, in 1974. She danced with the First Chamber Dance Company of New York. Her nephew is former Major League Baseball pitcher Barry Zito.  The Duffys lived near Eagle Point, Oregon, with their sons Padraic (b. 1974) and Conor (born c. 1980). 

Introduced to Buddhism by his wife, Duffy converted to Nichiren Buddhism and began chanting Nam Myōhō Renge Kyō. He and his family are longtime members of the Buddhist organization Soka Gakkai International.

On November 18, 1986, Duffy's parents were murdered by two young men, Kenneth Miller and Sean Wentz, during an armed robbery of the Boulder, Montana, tavern that his parents owned. Wentz and Miller, who were teenagers at the time, were convicted of the murders and sentenced to 75 years in prison. In 2001, Miller appeared before the Montana Parole board after Sean Wentz recanted his original story and admitted that he, Wentz, was the sole gunman. Miller was denied clemency in 2001 but was released on parole in December 2007.  Sean Wentz was granted parole in 2015.

Duffy's wife Carlyn Rosser died in 2017. In 2020, he entered into a relationship with actress Linda Purl.

Filmography

References

External links 
 
 
 Patrick Duffy is the leg of Scuzzlebutt on the South Park episode 'Volcano'

1949 births
Living people
Male actors from Montana
American people of Irish descent
American Buddhists
American male film actors
American game show hosts
American male stage actors
American male soap opera actors
American male television actors
American television directors
American male voice actors
Converts to Sōka Gakkai
Members of Sōka Gakkai
Nichiren Buddhists
University of Washington School of Drama alumni
People from Townsend, Montana
People from Eagle Point, Oregon
20th-century American male actors
21st-century American male actors